Shafaei is a Persian surname. Notable people with the surname include:

Mahvash Shafaei (born 1956), Iranian fencer, relative of Manouchehr
Manouchehr Shafaei (born 1949), Iranian fencer, human rights activist, and journalist

Persian-language surnames